Elizabeth Curnow may refer to:

 Betty Curnow (1911–2005), New Zealand artist
 Elizabeth Curnow (QC) (1935–2011), British barrister and judge